The 1999 Symmons Plains V8 Supercar round was the ninth round of the 1999 Shell Championship Series. It was held on the weekend of 6 to 8 August at Symmons Plains Raceway in Launceston, Tasmania.

Background 
Craig Lowndes was absent from the Symmons Plains round following his accident in the previous round at Calder Park, where he sustained injuries.

Race results

Qualifying

References

External links 

Symmons Plains